Events in the year 1961 in Taiwan, Republic of China. This year is numbered Minguo 50 according to the official Republic of China calendar.

Incumbents 
 President – Chiang Kai-shek
 Vice President – Chen Cheng
 Premier – Chen Cheng
 Vice Premier – Wang Yun-wu

Events

February
 20 February – The opening of Cingjing Farm in Nantou County.

April
 1 April – The establishment of the Project National Glory office.

July
 7 July – The establishment of Taipei Broadcasting Station.

October
 10 October – 50th Double Ten Day.
 23 October – The establishment of Taiwan Stock Exchange.
 31 October – The establishment of Republic of China Armed Forces Museum in Zhongzheng District, Taipei.

Births
 7 June – Eric Chu, Mayor of New Taipei (2010–2015, 2016-2018).
 31 August – Lu Shiow-yen, Mayor of Taichung.
 1 September – Jody Chiang, singer.
 2 October – Wang Ju-hsuan, Minister of Council of Labor Affairs (2008–2012).
 12 November – Su Jain-rong, Ministry of Finance.
 25 December – Lin Hsi-yao, Vice Premier of the Republic of China.

References

 
Years of the 20th century in Taiwan